Manuel "Manny" Victorino (born December 30, 1958) is a Filipino retired professional basketball player in the Philippine Basketball Association.

Player profile

Victorino is a 6–foot–5 slotman with the speed and skills of a small man. He is an impressive post-up player with a sweeping hook shot down the middle. He is also a dead-eye perimeter shooter and an excellent fastbreak finisher despite his size. Victorino ran the wings like a small forward and finished strong, usually with a powerful slam dunk.

The former Jose Rizal Heavy Bomber in the NCAA first caught the attention of cage buffs when he made it as alternate in the RP Youth team which took part in the 1979 World Youth Basketball championship held in Brazil. He entered the PBA in 1981 and was taken by Presto Fun Drinks from their farm team in the MICAA. Victorino went on to hold his own at a time when all-time greats Ramon Fernandez and Abet Guidaben were lording it over in the league. His stock climbed phenomenally in a span of few years and was already challenging Fernandez and company for supremacy inside the paint.

Mythical team and championships
His finest season came in 1984 when he won two titles for Great Taste and was named the league's Most Improved Player. He earn a spot on the Mythical Team for the first time that year and for three straight seasons until 1986, Victorino became a permanent fixture on the Mythical Five selection.

Traded to Shell & Return to Presto
In 1987, he was shipped by Great Taste to Shell in a pre-season trade for Philip Cezar. After two uneventful seasons with the Diesel Oilers, Victorino return to the Presto (formerly Great Taste) camp, the ballclub in which he was part of a dynasty of four straight championships from 1984-1985. He was second to Allan Caidic in scoring for Presto in the 1989 All-Filipino Conference, compile stats of 19.4 points and 7.2 rebounds an outing. Won his last championship with the Gokongwei franchise in the 1990 All-Filipino Conference, besting Purefoods Hotdogs in a seven-game series. Victorino's numbers were down with sophomore Zaldy Realubit getting more on his playing time.

Stints with Pepsi, Ginebra & Purefoods
He was traded to Pepsi for the Hotshots' first round pick in 1991 and Victorino got to play alongside Abet Guidaben for two seasons. In 1993, he welcomed the opportunity to play with Sonny Jaworski after being traded by Pepsi to Ginebra in exchange for rookie Victor Pablo. The following year, Ginebra traded him to Purefoods for Benito Cheng and his average and playing minutes went down, playing back-up role to Jerry Codiñera at the post. He won his final championship with Purefoods in the Commissioner's Cup but was left unsigned at the end of the year.

At age 37, he came back to play for Sunkist in his final PBA season.

Stats, Records & Oddities
In his 15–year basketball career, he scored 9,596 points in 727 games for a 13.2 point average and collected 4,450 rebounds, 1,035 assists, 817 shot blocks and 222 steals. He was the 18th player to hit the 5000–point mark in 1987 with Shell and was the seventh player to reach the 1,000 rebound plateau on both the offensive and defensive ends.

MBA stint
He later played a few games in the Metropolitan Basketball Association with the Cagayan de Oro Nuggets in 1998 and Surigao Miners in 1999 before calling it quits.

Victorino currently resides in Los Angeles, California with his family. He also plays regularly during Legends games.

Other media

Victorino appeared with his son Myki in ABS-CBN's former noontime show, Wowowee in 2009.  He also competed in TV5's dance reality show Shall We Dance?.

References

External links
Brown reunites with Great Taste teammate Victorino and Guidaben@ABS-CBN News

1958 births
Living people
Barangay Ginebra San Miguel players
Basketball players from Metro Manila
Centers (basketball)
Filipino men's basketball players
Great Taste Coffee Makers players
Magnolia Hotshots players
JRU Heavy Bombers basketball players
People from Mandaluyong
Philippine Basketball Association All-Stars
Pop Cola Panthers players
Power forwards (basketball)
TNT Tropang Giga players
Filipino emigrants to the United States